The White Center COVID-19 quarantine site is a quarantine site in the unincorporated King County, Washington neighborhood of White Center, near Seattle, Washington, in the United States. Residents who are diagnosed with COVID-19 but can not be quarantined at home, but who do not need emergency medical care, will be housed there. Many of them are expected to be the homeless.

The facility was funded by Public Health – Seattle & King County as part of a $28 million emergency spending package. The plan was announced on March 3 and the first trailer was installed there on the same day. There will be space for 32 people to be housed in eight trailers. By March 27, the trailers had plumbing and were ready for use.

Senator Joe Nguyen, who represents White Center in the Washington State Legislature, said he was "wary to see that this facility has been placed in a community already deeply disenfranchised by decades of policies working against it".

The White Center facility was one of five quarantine sites in King County by the end of March, with others in Kent, Issaquah, North Seattle, and one adjacent to Harborview hospital in Seattle.

References

Buildings and structures in King County, Washington
Health in Washington (state)